Thaddea Graham (born 29 March 1997) is a Northern Irish actress. She is known for her roles in the Sky One series Curfew, the Netflix series The Letter for the King and The Irregulars, the BBC One miniseries Us, Doctor Who: Flux and Wreck.

Early life and education
Graham was adopted from an orphanage in Changsha, China at one year old and was raised in County Down. She was one of the first international adoptees in Northern Ireland. She attended Killinchy Primary School in Killinchy and later Bloomfield Collegiate School in Ballyhackamore. She trained with Arts Educational School in London, graduating with a Bachelor of Arts in Acting in 2018.

Career
Graham made her television debut with a recurring role in season 3 of The Sparticle Mystery. In December 2018, she landed her first major role as Iona in the 2020 Netflix fantasy series The Letter for the King, an adaptation of the classic Dutch book by Tonke Dragt. The following December, she was cast as Bea in the 2021 Sherlock Holmes spinoff The Irregulars, also on Netflix. In the meantime, she played Hanmei Collins in the Sky One action series Curfew, and Kat in the BBC One comedy-drama miniseries Us. She joined the cast of Doctor Who for its thirteenth series (known as Doctor Who: Flux) as Bel, making her debut in Chapter Three: Once, Upon Time.

In 2022, Graham was in the main cast of the Virgin Media One and ITV crime drama Redemption as Siobhán Wilson and began starring as Vivian Lim opposite Oscar Kennedy and Jack Rowan in the BBC Three horror comedy Wreck. She has joined the cast of the Netflix comedy-drama Sex Education for its fourth season.

Filmography

Stage

References

External links

Living people
1997 births
21st-century actresses from Northern Ireland
Actresses from Changsha
British adoptees
Chinese emigrants to Northern Ireland
Irish adoptees
People educated at Bloomfield Collegiate School
People educated at the Arts Educational Schools
People from Newtownards
Television actresses from Northern Ireland